Peter Martyr is the name of:

Peter of Verona (1206–1252), 13th-century martyr
Peter Martyr Vermigli (1499–1562), 16th-century Italian theologian
Peter Martyr d'Anghiera (1457–1526), 16th-century Italian-born historian of Spain and its New World discoveries